Koh Dong-jin (born 1961) is a South Korean businessman. 

In 2015, Koh became the CEO of Samsung. In January 2020, Koh stepped down as Samsung CEO to become a  co-CEO leading the company's IT and mobile communications division.

References

1961 births
Living people
Samsung people
South Korean chief executives